Tino Häber (born 1982) is a German javelin thrower. He was born in Gera in Thuringia. He competed in javelin throw at the 2012 Summer Olympics in London, where he qualified for the final, and finished in 8th.

Seasonal bests by year
2004 - 79.88
2005 - 75.79
2006 - 71.62
2007 - 80.24
2008 - 80.71
2009 - 83.46
2010 - 79.74
2011 - 79.81
2012 - 82.10
2013 - 78.78

References

1982 births
Living people
Sportspeople from Gera
German male javelin throwers
Olympic athletes of Germany
Athletes (track and field) at the 2012 Summer Olympics